Ómar Julián Leal Covelli, commonly known as Julián Leal, (born May 11, 1990 in Bucaramanga) is a professional racing driver from Colombia. He has also competed with an Italian licence in the GP2 Series.

Career

Formula Renault 2.0
Leal began his racing career in 2006 in the Formula Renault 2.0 PanamGP series, scoring two podium finishes in seven races to finish ninth in the standings. He also took part in two races of the series the following year.

Euroseries 3000
The following season, Leal moved to Europe to compete in the Euroseries 3000 championship. Driving for the Italian Durango team, he finished ninth in the Euroseries standings and eleventh in the Italian Formula 3000 championship, which ran as part of the main series.

He continued in the championship in 2008, finishing sixth in the Euroseries after securing four podium places in fifteen races. In September of that year, he won the Italian Formula 3000 championship at Misano, beating both Fabio Onidi and Nicolas Prost to the title by a single point.

Formula Renault 3.5 Series
At the end of 2008, Leal took part in Formula Renault 3.5 Series testing at Paul Ricard and Valencia, driving for both Draco Racing and Prema Powerteam. In December 2008, it was announced that Leal had signed with Prema Powerteam for the 2009 season. He had a testing first season in the category, with a podium at the Hungaroring being his only points–scoring finish, as he wound up 20th in the standings.

In the off–season, Leal tested for both Prema and Mofaz Racing at the Circuit de Catalunya and in December 2009, it was announced that he would drive for Draco Racing in the 2010 season, partnering Formula Renault graduate Nathanaël Berthon. He again finished the season in 20th position after struggling to match his rookie team–mate, with his best race result being a fourth place at the first race in Brno.

Auto GP
In March 2010, it was announced that Leal would also compete in the new Auto GP championship, competing for the Italian team Trident Racing. He finished seventh in the final standings, with the highlight of his season coming at the penultimate round at the brand–new Circuito de Navarra, where he won the first race after starting from pole position.

GP2 Series

In November 2010, Leal tested a GP2 Series car for the first time, taking part in the post–season test at the Yas Marina Circuit in Abu Dhabi, and in January 2011 it was announced that he had signed with the Rapax Team to contest the GP2 Asia Series season, lining–up alongside Fabio Leimer. He had initially signed to contest only the Asia series, but in March 2011 it was confirmed that he would stay with the team for the main 2011 championship, in which he finished 27th.

Leal switched to the Trident Racing team for the non-championship season finale at Yas Marina, and remained with the outfit for the 2012 season, where he was partnered with Stéphane Richelmi. He scored his first series points and finished 21st in the championship.

Leal moved to Racing Engineering for the 2013 season, his teammate for the second time was champion of that year Fabio Leimer. He scored a total of 62 points, including two sprint race podiums leaving him 12th in the championship. For 2014, he moved to British squad Carlin alongside Felipe Nasr. He finished on the podium in both races at the first round but ultimately would finish 10th in the final standings on 68 points.

Leal continued with Carlin for 2015.

Racing record

Career summary

Complete Euroseries 3000/Auto GP results
(key) (Races in bold indicate pole position; races in italics indicate fastest lap)

Complete Formula Renault 3.5 Series results
(key) (Races in bold indicate pole position) (Races in italics indicate fastest lap)

† Driver did not finish the race, but was classified as he completed over 90% of the race distance.

Complete GP2 Series results
(key) (Races in bold indicate pole position) (Races in italics indicate fastest lap)

Complete GP2 Asia Series results
(key) (Races in bold indicate pole position) (Races in italics indicate fastest lap)

Complete GP2 Final results
(key) (Races in bold indicate pole position) (Races in italics indicate fastest lap)

Complete European Le Mans Series results

References

External links

Official website 

1990 births
Living people
Colombian racing drivers
Auto GP drivers
Latin America Formula Renault 2000 drivers
World Series Formula V8 3.5 drivers
GP2 Asia Series drivers
GP2 Series drivers
Durango drivers
Prema Powerteam drivers
Draco Racing drivers
Trident Racing drivers
Rapax Team drivers
Racing Engineering drivers
Carlin racing drivers
SMP Racing drivers
People from Bucaramanga
Sportspeople from Santander Department
European Le Mans Series drivers